John Wynford Philipps, 1st Viscount St Davids , (30 May 1860 – 28 March 1938) was a British Liberal politician.

Background and education
Philipps was the eldest son of Reverend Sir James Erasmus Philipps, 12th Baronet, Vicar of Warminster and Prebendary of Salisbury.  He was the elder brother of Ivor Philipps and Owen Philipps, 1st Baron Kylsant, both also MPs, and of Laurence Philipps, 1st Baron Milford. A fifth brother, Bertram, was the last private owner of Philipps House in Wiltshire.

Philipps was educated at Felsted School and at Keble College, Oxford, where he took a third-class honours degree in modern history in 1882.  He studied law at the Middle Temple and was called to the Bar in 1886.

Political career
Philipps sat as Member of Parliament (MP) for Mid Lanarkshire from 1888 to 1894.

He resigned his seat in 1894, but returned to Parliament sitting for Pembrokeshire from 1898 to 1908. Four years before he succeeded his father in the baronetcy, he was raised to the peerage as Baron St Davids, of Roch Castle in the County of Pembroke. In 1918 he was further honoured when he was made Viscount St Davids, of Lydstep Haven in the County of Pembroke. He was appointed Knight Grand Cross of the Order of the British Empire (GBE) in 1922.

Election results

Personal life
Lord St Davids was married twice. Firstly, on 14 February 1888 to Leonora Gerstenberg. They had two children:

Capt. Hon. Colwyn Erasmus Arnold Philipps (11 December 1888 – 13 May 1915)
Capt. Hon. Roland Erasmus Philipps (27 February 1890 – 7 July 1916)

His first wife, Leonora, died on 30 March 1915. Both their sons died during the First World War and thus predeceased their father and did not inherit his title.

Lord St Davids' second marriage was to Elizabeth Frances Abney-Hastings on 27 April 1916. They had two children:

 Jestyn Reginald Austin Plantagenet Philipps, 2nd Viscount St Davids (19 February 1917 – 10 June 1991)
 Hon. Lelgarde De Clare Elizabeth Philipps (23 September 1918 – 1984), who married, in 1950, Colin Charles Evans; they divorced in 1967.

Arms

References

External links

|-

1860 births
1938 deaths
Knights Grand Cross of the Order of the British Empire
Philipps, John
Lord-Lieutenants of Pembrokeshire
Philipps, John
Philipps, John
Philipps, John
Philipps, John
Philipps, John
Philipps, John
Philipps, John
UK MPs who were granted peerages
People educated at Felsted School
Pembroke Yeomanry officers
Members of the Privy Council of the United Kingdom
Peers created by Edward VII
Viscounts created by George V
1